Dr. Ernesto Foldats Andins (1925 – 2003), was born in Latvia, as Ernests Foldāts. He later moved to Venezuela, where he became a successful botanist and orchidologist.  He has held numerous official positions, e.g. Director of the School of Biology, Dean of the Faculcy of Science at the Universidad Central de Venezuela (1962–1968) and Scientific advisor to the commission on the Legislature and Environment.
He was Dr. Honoris causa at the University of Riga, Latvia.
Foldats was a member of Latvian student fraternity Fraternitas Vanenica.

Professional career
He undertook his initial studies at the Albert-Ludwigs-Universitaet Freiburg, Germany from 1945 to 1948. He moved to Venezuela in 1950, and graduated in Biological Sciences in 1954 at the Universidad Central de Venezuela.  He was awarded a Guggenheim Fellowship in 1958. He eventually received his doctorate in 1964 at the same university after having undertaken post-graduate courses and work in the United States (1958–1959). His 1964 doctoral thesis, "Orchids of Venezuela", identified 70 new orchids
and won the International Creole Prize and a monetary award of 10,000 dollars.  .  It was subsequently published in five volumes as La Flora de Venezuela las ORCHIDACEAE. He became Fellow of the Linnean Society in 1993.

Main works

References
 
 

 CV uploaded in first revision of this Wikipage

1925 births
2003 deaths
Scientists from Liepāja
Fellows of the Linnean Society of London
Central University of Venezuela alumni
Academic staff of the Central University of Venezuela
Latvian emigrants to Venezuela
Death in Caracas